The 1931 Tasmanian state election was held on 9 May 1931 in the Australian state of Tasmania to elect 30 members of the Tasmanian House of Assembly. The election used the Hare-Clark proportional representation system — six members were elected from each of five electorates. For the first time, voting was compulsory, resulting in a high voter turnout.

The Nationalist Party had defeated Labor by one seat at the 1928 election, and John McPhee had been Premier of Tasmania since then. Joseph Lyons left state politics in 1929 to enter federal politics, and was succeeded by Albert Ogilvie as leader of the dispirited Labor Party. The depression had struck Tasmania hard with unemployment nearly 30% and unions impotent.

The Nationalist Party won the 1931 election in a landslide, with 19 seats in the House of Assembly and a margin over Labor of more than 22%, the largest victory over Labor in Tasmania since Hare-Clark elections began in 1909. The win was attributed to public endorsement of McPhee's expenditure cuts over Ogilvie's expansionist policies. It has been said that Ogilvie's error was in  identifying with an unpopular federal Labor government.

Despite the scale of the Nationalist victory, the non-Labor forces in Tasmania did not win another election until 1969.

Results

|}

Distribution of votes

Primary vote by division

Distribution of seats

See also
 Members of the Tasmanian House of Assembly, 1931–1934
 Candidates of the 1931 Tasmanian state election

References

External links
Assembly Election Results, 1931, Parliament of Tasmania.
Report on General Election, 1931, Tasmanian Electoral Commission.

Elections in Tasmania
1931 elections in Australia
1930s in Tasmania
May 1931 events